Haustrum (plural: Haustra) may refer to:
 Haustrum (gastropod), a genus of sea snails, marine gastropod mollusks in the family Muricidae
 Haustrum (anatomy), small pouches of colon caused by sacculation, which give the colon its segmented appearance